Brwinów  is a town in Pruszków County, Masovian Voivodeship, Poland, about  from the centre of Warsaw. As of December 2021, the town has a population of 13,718.

Until 1954 Brwinów was the location of the Helenów parish council and between 1917 and 1949 it was also Letnisko-Brwinów's major town.

Between 1975 and 1998 Brwinów belonged to Warsaw Voivodeship. The town is located on the Łowicz–Błonie plains.

April 13, 2014 host Warsaw Eagles - Angels Toruń exhibition football game.

Brwinów is served by the Brwinów Railway Station.

Famous people 
 Leszek Bugajski, writer, editor "Twórczość" and essayist in "Newsweek"
 Leszek Engelking, poet, translator
 Henryk Waniek, painter
 Wacław Kowalski, actor
 Bolesław Hryniewiecki, naturalist
 Jerzy Hryniewiecki, architect
 Jarosław Iwaszkiewicz, writer, poet
 Aleksander Werner, painter, sculptor
 Wacław Werner, physist, teacher
 Macdaddy, mathematician

Demography

References

External links
 Jewish Community in Brwinów on Virtual Shtetl

Cities and towns in Masovian Voivodeship
Pruszków County